Severny is an urban locality (an urban-type settlement) under the administrative jurisdiction of the town of oblast significance of Taldom in Moscow Oblast, Russia. As a municipal division, Severny, together with the town of Taldom, another two urban-type settlements (Verbilki and Zaprudnya), and a number of rural localities is incorporated as Taldom Urban Okrug. Population: 

Until 2018, Severny belonged to Taldomsky District. As part of the reform of the administrative and municipal division of Moscow Oblast, Taldomsky District was abolished, and its territory, including Severny, was subordinated to the town of Taldom, which at the same time was elevated to the town of oblast significance. As a municipal division, Taldomsky Municipal District was abolished, and the same territory was incorporated as Taldom Urban Okrug. The formal denomination of the area is since 2018 the town of oblast significance of Taldom with added territory.

References

Notes

Sources

Urban-type settlements in Moscow Oblast